A bridge-spouted vessel is a particular design of ewer (jug or pitcher) originating in antiquity; there is typically a connecting element between the spout and filling aperture, and the spout is a completely independent aperture from the usually smaller central fill opening. Early examples of the bridge-spouted vessel are found in Ancient Persia in the early Iron Age and on Crete. This type of vessel typically appears in the Bronze Age or early Iron Age. 

There is a different type, called a double spout and bridge vessel, characteristic of the pottery of the Nazca culture of Pre-Columbian Peru, where two spouts rising vertically from the body of the vessel are linked by a bridge that apparently also served as a carrying handle.

See also
Stirrup jar

References

Bronze Age
Serving vessels
History of ceramics
Pre-Columbian pottery